Gregory Doran (born 24 November 1958) is an English director known for his Shakespearean work. The Sunday Times called him 'one of the great Shakespearians of his generation'.

Doran was artistic director of the Royal Shakespeare Company (RSC), succeeding Michael Boyd in September 2012. In an interview, announcing his appointment, Doran said that whilst Boyd had concentrated on the 'Company', he would be concentrating on the 'Shakespeare' in the Royal Shakespeare Company logo. Since April 2022 he is director emeritus at the Royal Shakespeare Company.

His notable productions include a production of Macbeth starring Antony Sher, which was filmed for Channel 4 in 2001, as well as Hamlet in 2008, starring David Tennant and Patrick Stewart.

Early life and education
Doran was born in Huddersfield, but his family moved to Lancashire when he was six months old. He was educated at St Pius X Catholic Preparatory School and Preston Catholic College.
He attended Bristol University studying English and Drama, where he set up his own theatre company with fellow student Chris Grady, presenting Shakespeare and related classics. He then trained as an actor at the Bristol Old Vic Theatre School. 

He received an honorary doctorate from Bristol University in July 2011 and an Honorary Degree from the University of Warwick in July 2013.

Career

Doran left the Bristol Old Vic School early having been invited to direct A Midsummer Night's Dream at Jamestown Community College in upstate New York. He then went to Nottingham Playhouse as an actor, before becoming Assistant Director then Associate Director, directing his own productions including Waiting for Godot, and Long Day's Journey into Night.

After a very brief acting career in TV, he joined the Royal Shakespeare Company in 1987 initially as an actor (as Solanio in The Merchant of Venice and Octavius Caesar in Julius Caesar) then became Assistant Director the following season.

He directed his first RSC production in 1992, commissioning Derek Walcott to write an adaptation of Homer's Odyssey which was performed at The Other Place.

In 1995 he directed his partner Antony Sher in the lead role of Titus Andronicus at the Market Theatre, Johannesburg, South Africa. This controversial production, which toured to the National Theatre, is the subject of their book, Woza Shakespeare!

He returned to the RSC in 1996, becoming an Associate Director, and directing Jane Lapotaire, Ian Hogg and Paul Jesson in All is True (or Henry VIII), his first Shakespeare for the company. Since then, Doran has directed over half the canon of Shakespeare's plays for the RSC.

Doran took compassionate leave from his role at the RSC in September 2021 to care for his husband, Antony Sher, who was terminally ill. His deputy Erica Whyman became acting artistic director. The RSC announced Doran was formally stepping down as artistic director in April 2022, becoming artistic director emeritus until the end of 2023.

TV and books

Doran contributed to Michael Wood's BBC series In Search of Shakespeare, and filmed a documentary for BBC Four called A Midsummer Night's Dreaming.

In 2009, Doran's Shakespeare Almanac was published.

Personal life
He and frequent collaborator Sir Antony Sher had been together since 1987 when they entered into a civil partnership in 2005. They married 10 years after their civil partnership, on 30 December 2015. Sher died in December 2021.

Theatre productions

RSC
1999
The Winter's Tale
Timon of Athens with Michael Pennington

2000
Macbeth (which was also made into a Channel 4 film)

2001
King John

2002
Much Ado About Nothing with Harriet Walter and Nicholas le Prevost
Doran supervised a season of seldom-performed Jacobean plays, including the debatedly Shakespearean Edward III and works by Philip Massinger, John Fletcher, Ben Jonson, John Marston and George Chapman which earned Doran a Laurence Olivier Award for Outstanding Achievement of the Year

2003
The Taming of the Shrew
Fletcher's sequel, The Tamer Tamed with Alexandra Gilbreath and Jasper Britton
All's Well That Ends Well took Judi Dench back to the RSC after 25 years

2004
Othello with Antony Sher and Sello Maake Ncube

2005
A Midsummer Night's Dream

2006
Antony and Cleopatra with Harriet Walter, and Patrick Stewart who both returned to the RSC after 24 years
Merry Wives The Musical, with Dame Judi Dench and Simon Callow

2007
Coriolanus with Will Houston, Janet Suzman and Timothy West which toured to Madrid and Washington DC (the final production in the Royal Shakespeare Theatre before it closed for redevelopment, re-opening in winter 2010/11)

2008
Doran directed a company in three plays in the Courtyard Theatre including a revival of his 2005 production of A Midsummer Night's Dream, plus Love's Labour's Lost  and Hamlet which both featured David Tennant

2009
Film adaptation of award-winning production of Hamlet was broadcast on BBC on Boxing Day.

2011
Written on the Heart, a play by David Edgar, to mark the 400th anniversary of the publication of the King James Bible.

2012
Directed Julius Caesar for the World Shakespeare Festival, which played in Stratford-upon-Avon, London, Moscow, New York and Ohio. For Winter 2012 he directed The Orphan of Zhao (Swan Theatre).

2013
Doran directed David Tennant in the title role of Richard II at the Royal Shakespeare Theatre and the Barbican.

2014
Directed Henry IV, Part 1 and Henry IV, Part 2 at the Royal Shakespeare Theatre. The production toured the UK, played at the Barbican, London and was screened live in cinemas. 
Directed The Witch of Edmonton in the Swan Theatre with Eileen Atkins in the title role.

2015
Arthur Miller's Death of a Salesman with Antony Sher in the role of Willy Loman, Alex Hassell as Biff and Harriet Walter as Linda Loman.
Shakespeare's Henry V

2016
Directed Shakespeare's King Lear with Antony Sher in the title role
The Tempest

2017
Directed a puppet-based performance of Venus & Adonis
Directed Imperium: Conspirator and Imperium: Dictator, based on the Cicero trilogy by Robert Harris

2018
Directed Antony Sher in King Lear at the Royal Shakespeare Theatre
Directed Troilus and Cressida

2019
Directed The Boy in the Dress (musical) at the Royal Shakespeare Theatre

2022
Directed Richard III at the Royal Shakespeare Theatre

Non-RSC
Doran has directed productions outside the RSC including:
 The York Mystery Plays in the Millennium production in York Minster, 2000
 The Real Inspector Hound and Black Comedy, 1998, Comedy Theatre, London
 Mahler's Conversion by Ronald Harwood, Aldwych Theatre, London
 The Giant by Antony Sher, Hampstead Theatre, London
 Anjin: the English Samurai by Mike Poulton
 The Merchant of Venice, Galaxy Theatre, Tokyo

References

External links

An audio biography of Gregory Doran

1958 births
Alumni of Bristol Old Vic Theatre School
Alumni of the University of Bristol
English male stage actors
English male television actors
English television directors
English theatre directors
English gay actors
Living people
Laurence Olivier Award winners
People from Preston, Lancashire
Royal Shakespeare Company members
Male actors from Yorkshire
Male actors from Lancashire
Male actors from Huddersfield